Veljusa (pronounced "Vel-yusa") is a village in the municipality of Strumica, North Macedonia. The village is situated on the slopes of Mount Elenica and is best known for the 11th century monastery, Holy Mother of God.

It is known for growing cherries, apples, as well as other fruit trees and vegetables.

Demographics
According to the 2002 census, the village had a total of 1,552 inhabitants. Ethnic groups in the village include:

Macedonians 1,548
Serbs 4

References

Villages in Strumica Municipality